"The Grass Is Greener" is a song written by Mike Anthony and Barry Mann and performed by Brenda Lee.  The song reached #7 on the adult contemporary chart and #17 on the Billboard Hot 100 in 1963.  The song is featured on her 1964 album, By Request.  The song reached #73 in Australia.

The single's B-side, "Sweet Impossible You", reached #28 in the UK and #70 on the Billboard Hot 100.

References

1963 songs
1963 singles
Songs written by Barry Mann
Brenda Lee songs
Decca Records singles